Ants Lauter ( – 30 October 1973) was an Estonian actor, theatre director and pedagogue, People's Artist of the USSR (1948).  He was born in Veski, Wiek County, and died, aged 79, in Tallinn.

Since 1974 the  has been given to a young stage actor or theatre director.

Filmography
1970 — Kolme katku vahel — Mr. Henrik Claesson Horn
1970 — King Lear
1970 — Valge laev — episode
1970 — Tuuline rand — episode
1969 — Must nagu mina
1969 — Posol Sovetskogo Soyuza
1969 — Viimne reliikvia / The Last Relic — Old man
1968 — Mehed ei nuta — managing director
1968 — Dead Season
1968 — Far in the West — grandfather
1965 — Mäeküla piimamees — Baron von Kremer
1964 — Hamlet — priest
1959 — Kutsumata külalised — Polkovnik Kikas
1958 — Esimese järgu kapten
1956 —  The Rumyantsev Case
1955 — Andruse õnn — Aruland
1951 — Valgus Koordis
1947 — Elu tsitadellis episode
1936 — VMV 6 — Captain of a smuggling vessel

References

This article includes content from the Russian Wikipedia article Лаутер, Антс Михкелевич.

External links

1894 births
1973 deaths
People from Märjamaa Parish
People from Kreis Wiek
Estonian male film actors
Estonian male stage actors
Soviet male film actors
19th-century Estonian people
20th-century Estonian male actors
People's Artists of the USSR
People's Artists of the Estonian Soviet Socialist Republic
Stalin Prize winners
Recipients of the Order of Lenin
Recipients of the Order of the Red Banner of Labour
Burials at Metsakalmistu